Haskin S. Smith was a state legislator in Mississippi. He represented Claiborne County, Mississippi in the Mississippi House of Representatives from 1872 to 1876. His marriage to a white woman (miscegnation) in 1874 was controversial. He opposed an 1875 proposal to have convicts work away from penetentiaries.

He was reported to have worked at a hotel in Port Gibson, Mississippi as a waiter and shoe shiner when he married and departed the area with the owner's daughter within whose family he had served.

See also
African-American officeholders during and following the Reconstruction era

References

Year of birth missing
Year of death missing
African-American state legislators in Mississippi
Members of the Mississippi House of Representatives